Carlos Durán Cartín, an accomplished doctor of medicine who had trained in London, 
was acting President of Costa Rica for a period of six months from 1889 to 1890, during the administration of President Bernardo Soto, who never resigned but didn't come back to office until the end of his term.

References

1852 births
1924 deaths
People from San José, Costa Rica
Costa Rican people of Spanish descent
Presidents of Costa Rica
Vice presidents of Costa Rica
Costa Rican physicians